The Pittsburgh Wallabies is a former Eastern Australian Football League and United States Australian Football League team. The club was based in Pittsburgh, Pennsylvania, United States.

The club in the USAFL in 2004 and the EAFL in 2005.

The club also held a tournament, known as the Steel City Boomerang Cup, which was played only once, in 2004.

References

Australian rules football clubs established in 2004
Australian rules football clubs in the United States
Defunct Pittsburgh sports teams
2004 establishments in Pennsylvania